Demirpınar can refer to:

 Demirpınar, Merzifon
 Demirpınar, Üzümlü